John Luckhardt is a former American football player and coach. He was the head football coach at California University of Pennsylvania in California, Pennsylvania from 2002 to 2011. Luckhardt coached at Washington & Jefferson College from 1982 to 1998, where he compiled a record of 137–37–2 and posted a school record for wins. He was elected to the Washington & Jefferson College Athletics Hall of Fame in 2007. Luckhardt was inducted into the College Football Hall of Fame as a coach in 2022.

Luckhardt attended Chartiers Valley High School. He then moved on to Purdue University and played for the Purdue Boilermakers, where he was a linebacker on the 1967 Rose Bowl team.

Head coaching record

Football

See also
 List of college football coaches with 200 wins

References

External links
 California profile
 

Year of birth missing (living people)
Living people
American football linebackers
California Vulcans football coaches
Lehigh Mountain Hawks football coaches
Northern Illinois Huskies football coaches
Purdue Boilermakers football coaches
Purdue Boilermakers football players
Washington & Jefferson Presidents athletic directors
Washington & Jefferson Presidents baseball coaches
Washington & Jefferson Presidents football coaches
College Football Hall of Fame inductees